Nóbrega is a surname and may refer to:

 Adaucto Nóbrega (born 1939), Brazilian chess master
 Ana Nóbrega (born 1980), Brazilian Christian singer and songwriter
 Braulio Nóbrega (born 1985), Spanish footballer
 Ana Sofia Nóbrega (born 1990), Angolan swimmer
 Antonio Nóbrega (born 1952), Brazilian singer, dancer and actor
 Francisco Nóbrega (born 1942), Portuguese footballer
 Dante Nobrega (born 1800), he’s Dante